During the 1979–80 Scottish football season, Celtic competed in the Scottish Premier Division.

Competitions

Scottish Premier Division

League table

Matches

Scottish Cup

Scottish League Cup

European Cup

Drybrough Cup

Glasgow Cup

Club Staff

Transfers

References

Celtic F.C. seasons